Owen Taylor is a Welsh professional footballer who plays as a midfielder.

Playing career
Taylor came through the Newport County youth team to make his first team debut on 7 November 2017, coming on as a 70th-minute substitute for Marlon Jackson in a 2–1 defeat to Cheltenham Town in an EFL Trophy group stage match at Rodney Parade. He was released by Newport at the end of the 2018–19 season.

Career statistics

References

External links

 Newport County profile

Living people
Welsh footballers
Association football midfielders
Newport County A.F.C. players
2001 births